Gérard Soler (born 29 March 1954 in Oujda, French Morocco) is a French-Moroccan former professional footballer of Catalan descent, who played as a forward or attacking midfielder. He played from 1972 until 1988, for Sochaux, Monaco, Bordeaux, Toulouse, Strasbourg, Bastia, Lille, Rennes and Orléans, where he retired. He briefly worked as a coach at Saint-Étienne in 2000.

Soler represented France at the 1982 World Cup, scoring their goal in a 3–1 defeat to England in Bilbao. He was the only player to score against England in the tournament. In total, Soler won 16 caps for France between 16 November 1974 and 31 May 1983, scoring four goals.

In May 2018, Soler was appointed president of the newly-formed football club C'Chartres Football.

References

External links
 
 

1954 births
Living people
People from Oujda
Association football midfielders
French footballers
French people of Catalan descent
France international footballers
FC Sochaux-Montbéliard players
AS Monaco FC players
FC Girondins de Bordeaux players
Toulouse FC players
RC Strasbourg Alsace players
SC Bastia players
Lille OSC players
Stade Rennais F.C. players
Ligue 1 players
1982 FIFA World Cup players
French football managers
AS Saint-Étienne managers
Pieds-Noirs